Elegance is beauty that shows unusual effectiveness and simplicity.

Elegance may also refer to:

 Elegance coral, a large polyp stony coral from the western Pacific Ocean
 Elegance Garden, a Private Sector Participation Scheme estate in Tai Po, Hong Kong, China
 Elegance (mathematics), the notion that some mathematicians may derive aesthetic pleasure from their work, and from mathematics in general
 Elegance (typeface), a letterpress typeface by Karlgeorg Hoefer for Ludwig & Mayer

See also
 Robert Elegant (born 1928), British-American author and journalist
 Petronius ( - 66), Roman courtier, nicknamed elegantiae arbiter or arbiter elegantiarum, "judge of elegance"